La Oliva is a town and a municipality in the northern part of the island of Fuerteventura in the Province of Las Palmas, Canary Islands, Spain. The population is 25,083 (2013), and the area is 356.13 km2. The municipality includes the Lobos Island to the northeast. The largest town of the municipality, Corralejo, is a port town and beach resort at the northernmost point of the island. La Oliva is the historic seat of the island's Colonels, who resided in the stately Casa de los Coroneles. Because of this, La Oliva succeeded the Villa de Betancuria as the capital of Fuerteventura from 1834 until 1860, when Puerto Cabras became the new capital.

An anonymous manuscript relates that the town of La Oliva was founded in 1500 by individuals known to the Hernández brothers, residents of Betancuria.

Gallery

See also
List of municipalities in Las Palmas

References

External links

La Oliva Information, photos and map

Municipalities in Fuerteventura
Populated places established in 1500